Zainab Amir Gama (born March 30, 1949) is a former Member of Parliament in the National Assembly of Tanzania.

References

Members of the National Assembly (Tanzania)
Living people
1949 births
Place of birth missing (living people)
21st-century Tanzanian politicians